Erik Andersen may refer to:

 Erik Andersen (chess player) (1904–1938), Danish chess player
 Erik Andersen (cyclist) (1902–1980), Danish Olympic cyclist
 Erik Andersen (fencer) (1919–1993), Danish Olympic fencer
 Erik Andersen (politician) (born 1937), Norwegian politician
 Erik Bo Andersen (born 1970), Danish former professional footballer
 Erik Andersen (child molester) (born 1952), also referred to as "The Pocket Man", convicted Norwegian child molester

See also   
 Eric Andersen (born 1943), American singer-songwriter
 Eric Andersen (artist) (born 1940), Danish fluxus artist
 Erik Andersson (disambiguation)
 Eric Anderson (disambiguation)